Texas's 11th congressional district of the United States House of Representatives is in the midwestern portion of the state of Texas, stretching from the Permian Basin through the Hill Country to the outer fringes of the Dallas–Fort Worth metroplex.  Major cities in the district are Andrews, Midland, Odessa, San Angelo, Granbury, and Brownwood. The current Representative from the 11th district is Republican August Pfluger.

Texas has had at least 11 districts since 1883. The current configuration dates from the 2003 Texas redistricting; its first congressman, Mike Conaway, took office in 2005. It is one of the most Republican districts in the nation. Much of the territory now in the district began shaking off its Democratic roots far sooner than the rest of Texas.  For instance, Barry Goldwater did very well in much of this area in 1964, and Midland itself last supported a Democrat for president in 1948.  While Democrats continued to hold most local offices here well into the 1980s and continued to represent parts of the region through the 1990s, today Republicans dominate every level of government, usually winning by well over 70 percent of the vote. There are almost no elected Democrats left above the county level.

It was President George W. Bush's strongest district in the entire nation in the 2004 election. Since its creation, the Republicans have never dropped below 75 percent of the vote. The Democrats have only put up a candidate five times, only one of whom has even won 20 percent of the vote.

From 1903-2005 the district was based in central Texas and contained Waco.

List of members representing the district

Election results from presidential races

Recent election results

Historical district boundaries

See also

List of United States congressional districts

References

 Congressional Biographical Directory of the United States 1774–present

11